Ham Lake is a lake in Hubbard County, in the U.S. state of Minnesota.

Ham Lake was so named on account of its outline being shaped like a ham.

See also
List of lakes in Minnesota

References

Lakes of Minnesota
Lakes of Hubbard County, Minnesota